Zhao Keshi (born November 1947) is a retired general in the Chinese People's Liberation Army.  He is originally from Gaoyang County in Hebei province.  He has been director of the Logistic Support Department since 2012. He formerly served as commander of the Nanjing Military Region from 2007 to 2012.

Biography
Zhao joined the army in 1968.  He has held several positions, including the head of training for the Nanjing Military Region, the chief of staff for the 31st army group, commander  for the 31st army group, deputy chief of staff for the Nanjing Military Region, chief of staff for the Nanjing Military Region, commander for the Nanjing Military Region. He became the commander of the 31st army group in 2000.  In June 2004, he became the chief of staff and deputy commander for the Nanjing Military Region.  He was elevated to his present rank of lieutenant general the next year, and took up his post as commander of the Nanjing Military Region in 2007. In 2012, he was made director of Logistic Support Department. He was promoted to full general (shang jiang) on July 20, 2010. He has been a member of the 17th Central Committee of the Communist Party of China as well as the 18th Central Committee.

References 

Members of the 17th Central Committee of the Chinese Communist Party
Members of the 18th Central Committee of the Chinese Communist Party
1947 births
Living people
People's Liberation Army generals from Hebei
Politicians from Baoding
Commanders of the Nanjing Military Region
Chiefs of Staff of the Nanjing Military Region
People's Liberation Army General Logistics Department
People's Republic of China politicians from Hebei
Chinese Communist Party politicians from Hebei